Keep It Simple is the thirty-third album by Northern Irish singer/songwriter Van Morrison, released in March 2008. It was Morrison's first US Top 10 album, and made the Top 10 in the UK, Canada and in some European countries. It was his first studio album of all new original material since Back on Top (1999), and includes elements of jazz, folk, blues, celtic, country, soul and gospel.

Composition
Morrison said that that album has "got elements of blues, folk, gospel - all my influences . . . Curtis Mayfield. It's got a lot of inspiration from various things I was inspired by out there, but it comes out like a new album." Unlike his preceding releases, the album was entirely self-penned, with Morrison saying, "I felt I had something to say with these songs." Morrison said of the track "That's Entrainment", "Entrainment is when you connect with the music. Entrainment is really what I'm getting at in the music. It's kind of when you're in the present moment - you're here - with no past or future."

Promotion
Morrison announced a short United States tour to promote the album with appearances in Austin, Texas; Nashville, Tennessee (at the Ryman Auditorium); Boston, Massachusetts; and in New York City, starting on 11 March.  During this tour, he also performed at La Zona Rosa in Austin, Texas, at the South by Southwest (SXSW) music conference and festival on 12 March.

"Entrainment" was played for the first time, at the beginning of the second hour, on Chris Evans BBC Radio 2 Drivetime show on Wednesday, 30 January, with Evans commenting: "The new Van Morrison album came with a shoot-to-kill warning if played before a certain date, but that's now been lifted so we can play it." On 8 March, Morrison gave an interview on BBC Radio 4's Today show, and an hour long interview on the Paul Jones show on BBC Two Radio. On 15 March, Morrison performed all of the songs from the album on concert broadcast on BBC Radio 2. 

The album was released on 17 March by Exile Productions Ltd./Polydor in the UK and on the Lost Highway Records label on 1 April in the US.  His previous studio album Pay the Devil was also released on the Lost Highway label, in March 2006.

Reception

On its first week of release the album reached No. 10 on the US charts, which was Morrison's highest placement in the US at that point. His previous highest charting effort was his sixth solo album, Saint Dominic's Preview, which rose to No. 15 in 1972.  In 2016, Keep Me Singing would rise to No. 9, his best score to date. 

Most critics responded favourably with four star ratings from The Star, The Sun, The Times and Uncut. "There's a certain grace to Van's stripped-back band", one review found, "and as always he evokes images of sorrow and anguish, but with such beauty and warmth that you can't help but smile when you hear them." Rolling Stone notes how "the band settles into a groove while Morrison lifts off into the trancelike realm he calls 'entrainment'." The Guardian praised Morrison's "velvety gargle", and the many "tasteful, blues-by-numbers shuffles", but concluded, "Perhaps a spot more complication for album 34 might help."

Track listing
All songs by Van Morrison

"How Can a Poor Boy?" - 5:43
"School of Hard Knocks" - 3:44
"That's Entrainment" - 4:32
"Don't Go to Nightclubs Anymore" - 4:31
"Lover Come Back" - 5:15
"Keep It Simple" - 3:34
"End of the Land" - 3:16
"Song of Home" - 4:13
"No Thing" - 4:31
"Soul" - 3:37
"Behind the Ritual" - 6:59

iTunes Bonus Track
(available UK week of 17 March 2008 and U.S. on 1 April 2008)
 "Little Village"  - 6:11 (Live) (Album Only)

Vinyl Bonus Tracks
 "Blue & Green" - 5:52 (Live)
 "Little Village"  - 6:11 (Live) 
 "And The Healing Has Begun"  - 7:11 (Live)

Recorded live in concert at the Blackpool Opera House (UK) 26 January 2008

Personnel
Van Morrison - vocals, piano, alto saxophone, acoustic guitar, ukulele ("That's Entertainment", "Keep It Simple" and "Behind the Ritual")
John Platania - guitar
Mick Green - guitar
Ned Edwards - guitar, harmonica, backing vocals
Sarah Jory  - steel guitar, banjo ("Song of Home" and "Don't go to Nightclubs Anymore")
Cindy Cashdollar - steel guitar ("No Thing" and "Lover Come Back")
Paul Moore - bass
David Hayes - bass ("No Thing", "Lover Come Back" and "End of the Land")
Geraint Watkins - piano, accordion ("Soul", "Keep It Simple" and "School of Hard Knocks")
John Allair - organ
Liam Bradley - percussion
Tony Fitzgibbon - fiddle ("How Can a Poor Boy?")
Neal Wilkinson - drums
Crawford Bell - acoustic guitar, backing vocals
Katie Kissoon - backing vocals ("Lover Come Back", "End of the Land" and "No Thing")
Karen Hamill - backing vocals
Margo Buchanan - backing vocals ("How Can a Poor Boy?", "Don't go to Nightclubs Anymore" and "Song of Home")
Stevie Lange - backing vocals ("How Can a Poor Boy?", "Don't go to Nightclubs Anymore" and "Song of Home")
Jerome Rimson - backing vocals ("School of Hard Knocks", "Soul" and "Behind the Ritual")

Sleeve notes
Mastered by Tim Young at Metropolis Mastering
Design by Jon Gilbert@Angelfire
Photograph of Van Morrison by Patrick Baird

Charts

Notes

External links
Van Morrison at Lost Highway Records

2008 albums
Van Morrison albums
Lost Highway Records albums
Albums produced by Van Morrison